(Manx for Little people, also , , , and  from the ) is the umbrella term for Manx fairies.

Descriptions 

A wide variety of individual mythical creatures come under the umbrella of sleih beggey. With both benevolent and malevolent fairies.

Generally, the Sleih Beggey are seen as stocky in stature, and as domestic fairies, who lived in burghs. They are fond of hunting, music, and abducting humans. They dislike ashes, artificial light, salt, and baptisms. They commonly wore green clothes. Many were also known to steal babies, and in doing so getting into fights with humans.

John Rhys noted that Manx and Welsh fairies were similar in most aspects, but that Manx fairies had no issue using weapons to attack humans, unlike the Welsh fairies.

The Ferrish have been described as a particular tribe of fairies, standing between one and three foot tall, who rode horses and kept dogs for hunting, having no named king or queen. They were known to replace human babies with changelings, as with many other fairies in the British Isles and Ireland.

In media 
In the manga and anime, The Ancient Magus' Bride the Sleigh Beggy are a special type of mage.

See also 

 Arkan Sonney
 Adhene
 Fenodyree
 Glashtyn
 Leprechaun
 Kobold
 Tuatha Dé Danann
 Aos Sí
 Buggane
 Jimmy Squarefoot
 Moddey Dhoo

References 

Fairies
European legendary creatures
Manx legendary creatures
Manx folklore